The Breeders' Stakes is a South Australian Jockey Club Group 3 Thoroughbred horse race for two-year-olds, over a distance of 1200 metres, held annually at Morphettville Racecourse in Adelaide, Australia during the autumn.  Total prizemoney is A$127,250.

History
Notable horses to win the event in the 1960s include Pago Pago and Storm Queen who went on to win the Golden Slipper Stakes as well as champion Tobin Bronze.  
The race was held in early February, but was moved to later in the autumn.

Distance
1955–1972  -  6 furlongs (~1200m)
1973–1979  -  1200 metres
 1980 - 1450 metres
1981–2001  -  1200 metres
 2002 - 1263 metres 
2003 onwards  -  1200 metres

Grade
1955–1978 - Principal Race
1979–2005 - Group 2
2006 onwards - Group 3

Name
1955–1967  -   Bloodhorse Breeders' Stakes
1968–1979  -   Blue Breeders' Stakes
1980–1983  -   Bloodhorse Breeders' Stakes
1984–1993  -   West End Breeders' Stakes
1994 onwards -  Breeders' Stakes

Venue
In 1980 the event was held at Victoria Park Racecourse.
In 2002 the event was held at Cheltenham Park Racecourse.

Winners

 2022 - See You In Heaven
 2021 - Cloudy
 2020 - Ecumenical
 2019 - Kooweerup
 2018 - Tequila Time
 2017 - Broadband
 2016 - Tris
 2015 - Last Bullet
 2014 - London Lolly
 2013 - Excites Zelady
 2012 - Big Chill
 2011 - Rockshaft
 2010 - Shrapnel
 2009 - Colour
 2008 - Augusta Proud
 2007 - Murjana
 2006 - De Lago Mist
 2005 - Freestyle
 2004 - Deprivation
 2003 - Syrinx
 2002 - Great Glen
 2001 - Pelt
 2000 - Happy Morning
 1999 - Ruthless Tycoon
 1998 - Astralita
 1997 - Gold Guru
 1996 - Zeya
 1995 - Padre
 1994 - Blevic
 1993 - Laubali
 1992 - Credit Account
 1991 - Jakpil
 1990 - Berberia
 1989 - Golden Prayer
 1988 - Sovereign Lady
 1987 - Exploding Wonder
 1986 - Military Plume
 1985 - New Atlantis
 1984 - Lockley's Tradition
 1983 - Coral Queen
 1982 - Lady Neelia
 1981 - Neptune Princess
 1980 - Outward Bound  
 1979 - Runaway Kid
 1978 - Pacifica
 1977 - Red Cat
 1976 - Out Of Danger
 1975 - Aconite
 1974 - Girl Wonder
 1973 - Fill The Cellar
 1972 - Colambre
 1971 - Big Sioux
 1970 - Regal Heir
 1969 - Morning Joy
 1968 - Lady Freux
 1967 - Manihi
 1966 - Storm Queen
 1965 - Tobin Bronze
 1964 - Lady Pompilia
 1963 - Pago Pago
 1962 - Leica Lot
 1961 - Heir Apparent
 1960 - Jet Beau
 1959 - Happy Smile
 1958 - Resenda
 1957 - Mapleson
 1956 - Alstarr
 1955 - Eminent Star

See also
 List of Australian Group races
 Group races

References

Horse races in Australia
Sport in Adelaide